Lord Alfred Hervey (25 June 1816 – 15 April 1875), known before 1826 as Alfred Hervey, was a British politician.

Biography

Early life
Alfred Hervey was born on 25 June 1816. He was the youngest son of Frederick Hervey, 1st Marquess of Bristol and Elizabeth Albana (1775–1844). His maternal grandfather was Clotworthy Upton, 1st Baron Templetown. He received his education at Eton and Trinity College, Cambridge.

Career
He served as a Junior Lord of the Treasury in Lord Aberdeen's coalition government and Lord Palmerston's first government.

He was one of the two MPs for Brighton during the years 1842–1857. Active in the affairs of the town, he was a founder Vice President of Brighton College and served on its Council from 1845 to 1875. From 1859 to 1865, he was MP for Bury St Edmunds. He was a member of the Canterbury Association from 27 March 1848.

Personal life
On 5 August 1845 he married Sophia Elizabeth Cheste. Their eldest son Reverend Canon Frederick Alfred John Hervey (1846–1910) was Chaplain-in-Ordinary to Queen Victoria from 1886 to 1901 and Domestic Chaplain to King Edward VII from 1878 to 1910.

Death
He died on 15 April 1875.

References

thePeerage.com
 Martin D W Jones, Brighton College 1845–1995 (Phillimore, 1995), pp. 9, 12, 15–16, 44, 50.

External links 
 

1816 births
1875 deaths
People educated at Eton College
Members of the Parliament of the United Kingdom for English constituencies
UK MPs 1841–1847
UK MPs 1847–1852
UK MPs 1852–1857
UK MPs 1857–1859
UK MPs 1859–1865
Alfred
Younger sons of marquesses
Members of the Canterbury Association